Juan Gualberto Espínola González (born 12 July 1953) is a former Paraguayan football right back. Espínola was a member of Paraguay national team and he won 1979 Copa América with the team.

Honours

Club
 Libertad
 Paraguayan Primera División: 1976

International
 Paraguay
 Copa América: 1979

References

External links
 
 

1953 births
Living people
Paraguayan footballers
Paraguay international footballers
Copa América-winning players
1979 Copa América players
Club Libertad footballers
Association football defenders